The Girl from Maxim's (French: La dame de chez Maxim's) is a 1950 French comedy film directed by Marcel Aboulker and starring Arlette Poirier, Saturnin Fabre and Marcelle Monthil. It is an adaptation of the 1899 farce La Dame de chez Maxim by Georges Feydeau.

Cast
 Arlette Poirier as La môme Crevette
 Saturnin Fabre as Le général Petypon du Grêlé
 Marcelle Monthil as Mme. Petypon
 Jacques Morel as Le docteur Petypon
 Marcelle Praince as La duchesse
 Robert Vattier as Le docteur Montgicourt
 Jean Marsan as Le lieutenant Corrigon
 Luc Andrieux as Etienne
 Colette Ripert as Clémentine
 Jacques Fabbri as Le duc
 Jacques Beauvais as Eugène
 Pierre Flourens
 Philippe de Chérisey
 Albert Rieux

See also
 Maxim's

References

Bibliography
 Hayward, Susan. French Costume Drama of the 1950s: Fashioning Politics in Film. Intellect Books, 2010.
 Oscherwitz, Dayna & Higgins, MaryEllen. The A to Z of French Cinema. Scarecrow Press, 2009.

External links

1950 films
1950s French-language films
French films based on plays
Films based on works by Georges Feydeau
Films directed by Marcel Aboulker
Gaumont Film Company films
Films set in Paris
French historical comedy films
1950s historical comedy films
Films set in the 1890s
French black-and-white films
1950s French films